Charles Minshall Jessop (1861 – March 9, 1939) was a mathematician at the University of Durham working in algebraic geometry.

Selected publications

References

External links
 

English mathematicians
1861 births
1939 deaths